John McMaster (4 January 1893 – 27 December 1954) was a Scottish footballer who played for Celtic and Queen of the South, as a left half or centre half. He won the Scottish Football League title with Celtic in the 1913–14, 1914–15, 1915–16 and 1921–22 seasons, the Scottish Cup in 1914, two Glasgow Cups and three Charity Cups. 

He also fought in World War I serving with the Royal Army Service Corps, and was wounded in France in 1918.
 He was selected for the British Army football team in a 1917 fundraising match, and had played in the Glasgow FA's annual challenge match against Sheffield in 1914, but received no further representative honours.

References

1893 births
1954 deaths
Scottish footballers
People from Port Glasgow
Footballers from Inverclyde
Association football wing halves
Association football central defenders
Celtic F.C. players
Clydebank Juniors F.C. players
Fulham F.C. wartime guest players
Ayr United F.C. players
Birmingham City F.C. players
Queen of the South F.C. players
Scottish Junior Football Association players
Scottish Football League players
British Army personnel of World War I
Royal Army Service Corps soldiers